David also known by the hypocorism Datuna ( 1612 – 1648) was a prince (batonishvili) of the royal house of Kakheti, a kingdom in eastern Georgia. He was the only son of King Teimuraz I of Kakheti to have survived into adulthood. He fathered the future King Heraclius I of Kakheti, who continued the royal line of the Kakhetian Bagrationi. From 1627 until his death in battle with the pro-Persian Georgian ruler Rostom of Kartli, he held sway over the fief of Mukhrani, whose princely rulers had been dispossessed by Teimuraz I.

Early life 
David was born around 1612 into the family of Teimuraz I, the king of the eastern Georgian kingdom of Kakheti, and his second wife Khorashan, a sister of the neighboring Georgian monarch, Luarsab II of Kartli. He was the youngest of Teimuraz's sons and the king's only male offspring to have survived into adulthood. David's two elder half-brothers died in captivity in Persia, castrated at the order of the Persian shah Abbas I, who fought a devastating war against Kakheti in order to bend Teimuraz I into submission. David emerged in the political life of eastern Georgia in 1627, when he was bestowed with the princedom of Mukhrani, the fief of Kaikhosro, Prince of Mukhrani, a disgraced nobleman of Kartli, who had been forced to seek refuge in the Ottoman Empire along with Teimuraz's domestic arch-rival, Giorgi Saakadze.

Later years and death 
In 1633, Teimuraz was overthrown by the seasoned Muslim Georgian prince Rostom Khan, who had come to conquer Kartli and Kakheti at the head of a Persian army. David was able, for the time being, to retain his hold of Mukhrani, and endeavored to meet Rostom for negotiations at Surami, but he suspected treachery and quickly withdrew to his estate. Rostom's attempts to win him over went in vain and David rallied to his father's cause as Teimuraz, having resumed his reign in Kakheti in 1638, marched with the Kakhetian army to dislodge Rostom from Kartli in 1648. Having taken command of his father's troops, David was attacked and defeated by Rostom's Persian auxiliaries at Magharo. David himself was killed in battle at the hand of the Kazakh officer Jamal Khan. David's severed head was delivered to Rostom. Teimuraz lost the crown of Kakheti at once. Through Rostom's magnanimity, he was able to retire to his in-laws in the western Georgian kingdom of Imereti and also have his last son, David, buried at the cathedral of St. George of Alaverdi. Mukhrani was restored to a member of its earlier princely family, Vakhtang II.

Family 
David married, in 1628, Princess Elene (died December 1695), former wife of Duke David of Aragvi and daughter of Prince Levan Diasamidze, who was a brother of the catholicos Eudemus I. After David's death, Elene followed her father-in-law in his Muscovite exile, bringing the son Nikoloz with her in 1653. She died in Georgia and was buried at the Alaverdi cathedral in Kakheti. The couple had four sons and two daughters: 
 Prince Luarsab (died 1659).
 Prince Giorgi (died 1651); he was adopted and designated as heir apparent by his aunt's husband, King Alexander III of Imereti, in 1649, but the arrangement was disrupted by Giorgi's sudden death.  
 Prince Nikoloz (Erekle) (1643 – 1709), the future king of Kakheti and Kartli under the name of Heraclius I or Nazar Ali Khan. 
 Prince Ioseb (died 1648); he was affianced in 1646 to a sister of Tsar Alexis of Russia.
 Princess Anastasia 
 Princess Ketevan (1648 – 16 April 1719); she was married, successively, to King Bagrat V of Imereti (1660–1661), Prince Gogoberidze, and thirdly, to Archil, King of Kakheti and Imereti (22 March 1668 – 1698). She died in Moscow and was buried at the Donskoy Monastery.

Ancestry

References 

1610s births
1648 deaths
Bagrationi dynasty of the Kingdom of Kakheti
Georgian princes
17th-century people from Georgia (country)